Adriana Abascal López-Cisneros (born October 31, 1970) is a Mexican-born model, who has appeared on the covers of magazines including Elle, Vogue, Marie Claire, Hola! and Vanity Fair, she is also an executive producer, TV show host (US & Latin America), and an author.

She won the title of Señorita Mexico in 1988 and participated in "Miss Universe 1989".

Abascal became a host of the Emmy-nominated TV show "Todobebé" which aired nationally on Telemundo and syndicated across Latin America. In 2002, she wrote the book “Una mujer, cada Mujer”  (One woman, every Woman), distributed in the US, Mexico, and Spain.

She has participated in designer shows including  Paris Haute Couture - Armani, Valentino, Giambattista Valli, Versace, John Paul Gaultier, Stephane Rolland, Thierry Lasry, Alber Elbaz, and at NY Fashion Week - Ralph Lauren, Oscar de la Renta, Tory Burch, Cusnie et Ochs, Novis, Lela Rose, Christian Siriano and Tommy Hilfiger.

In 2013, Abascal became the host and main judge of the series, "Desafio Fashionista" for Discovery Home & Health.  In 2014, she produced the show "My Style Stories" with E-Entertainment.

Currently, she divides her time between Paris and Los Angeles. She speaks Spanish, English, French, and Italian.

Personal
Abascal had a relationship with Televisa's owner Emilio Azcárraga Milmo from 1990 until his death in 1997. She later married Spanish businessman Juan Villalonga in 2000; this marriage produced daughters Paulina and Jimena and son Diego, but they divorced in 2009. In June 2013, she married French businessman Emmanuel Schreder, a company CEO, in Ibiza.

References

1970 births
Living people
Mexican beauty pageant winners
Miss Universe 1989 contestants
People from Veracruz (city)
Mexican women writers